Han Yong (born October 1956) is a Chinese politician, serving since 2016 as the Chairman of the Shaanxi People's Political Consultative Conference. He spent his early career in his native Jilin province, before being transferred to work in Xinjiang in 2004, where he served as regional organization chief, deputy party chief, and political commissar of the Xinjiang Production and Construction Corps.

Biography
Han was born in Jiutai County, Jilin province. He joined the Communist Party in 1976, the year Mao died. After the Cultural Revolution he studied law at Jilin University.

In his earlier career, Han was a clerk with the provincial prosecution agency of Jilin, then a deputy district prosecutor in Changchun, the provincial capital. He then worked for the provincial prosecution agency. He served as deputy mayor of Yulin, Shaanxi, then head prosecutor of Songyuan, then deputy head prosecutor of Jilin province, then deputy secretary of the provincial Commission for Discipline Inspection, provincial director of supervision, and other positions. He earned an on-the-job graduate degree in international political studies at the Central Party School.

In July 2004 he was moved to Xinjiang to serve on the regional Party Standing Committee and head of the regional Organization Department. In December 2010 he was named deputy regional party chief. In November 2012, he was named an alternate member of the 18th Central Committee of the Communist Party of China.

In April 2015, he replaced Che Jun as the Political Commissar of the Xinjiang Production and Construction Corps. He served in the role for less than a year, before being transferred to Shaanxi to become Chairman of the provincial committee of the Chinese People's Political Consultative Conference.

References

Politicians from Changchun
1956 births
Political office-holders in Xinjiang
Jilin University alumni
Political office-holders in Jilin
Living people
Chinese Communist Party politicians from Jilin
People's Republic of China politicians from Jilin